Gaetano Pirastu (born 22 July 1955) is an Italian boxer. He competed in the men's lightweight event at the 1976 Summer Olympics. He lost in the opening round to Roberto Andino of Puerto Rico.

References

External links
 

1955 births
Living people
Italian male boxers
Olympic boxers of Italy
Boxers at the 1976 Summer Olympics
People from Oristano
Lightweight boxers
Sportspeople from Sardinia
20th-century Italian people